Shana Cleveland is an American musician, writer, and visual artist based in Los Angeles, California. Best known as the lead guitarist and vocalist for surf rock band La Luz, Cleveland was previously a member of The Curious Mystery, and has also released music as a solo artist. Cleveland's writing and visual art has appeared in publications such as Black Clock, the Columbia Poetry Review, Court Green, and Vice.

Discography

With La Luz
Damp Face EP (2012)
It's Alive (2013)
Weirdo Shrine (2015)
Floating Features (2018)
La Luz (2021)

With The Curious Mystery
Rotting Slowly (2009)
We Creeling (2011)

Solo
Oh Man, Cover the Ground (2015) (as Shana Cleveland and the Sandcastles)
Night of the Worm Moon (2019)
Manzanita (2023)

References

American women songwriters
American folk guitarists
American rock guitarists
American women rock singers
American bandleaders
Surf musicians
Bandleaders
Hardly Art artists
Lead guitarists
Suicide Squeeze Records artists
Musicians from Seattle
People from Kalamazoo, Michigan
Songwriters from Michigan
Singers from Michigan
21st-century American women guitarists
21st-century American guitarists
Singers from Washington (state)
Songwriters from Washington (state)
Living people
Year of birth missing (living people)
Guitarists from Washington (state)
Guitarists from Michigan
21st-century American women singers
21st-century American singers